Amzath Basha Shaik Bepari is an Indian politician who is the 12th and current Deputy Chief Minister of Andhra Pradesh and MLA from Kadapa.

He belongs to the YSRCP. He started his political career as a Corporator from Kadapa Municipal Corporation in 2009 under YSR rule and was later elected as MLA with more than 30,000 majority in 2014 Elections. He continued his loyalty with Y. S. Jaganmohan Reddy and now has won with more than 50,000 majority from Kadapa constituency, the fourth highest majority in the State Assembly elections. He is from the business family namely called as "Haroon sab" family. He completed his school education in Nirmala English Medium School and Intermediate from St. Joseph Jr. college and studied for the graduation at Govt. Arts College, Kadapa.

In 2019, he became one of the five Deputy Chief Ministers of Andhra Pradesh in the Y. S. Jaganmohan Reddy led cabinet and was also given a charge of Minister of Minority welfare.

MLA terms

References

Andhra Pradesh MLAs 2014–2019
People from Kadapa
YSR Congress Party politicians
Living people
Indian National Congress politicians
Andhra Pradesh MLAs 2019–2024
Deputy Chief Ministers of Andhra Pradesh
Year of birth missing (living people)